Purinergic Signalling is a quarterly peer-reviewed scientific journal covering research on purinergic signalling. It is published by Springer Science+Business Media and its editor-in-chief is Geoffrey Burnstock (UCL Medical School).

Abstracting and indexing 
The journal is abstracted and indexed in:

According to the Journal Citation Reports, it has a 2012 impact factor of 2.635.

References

External links 
 

Springer Science+Business Media academic journals
Neuroscience journals
English-language journals
Quarterly journals
Publications established in 2004